Michael Gilday (born January 5, 1987) is a Canadian former short track speed skater from Yellowknife, Northwest Territories.

After missing a spot on the Vancouver 2010 team by just 13 one-hundredths of a second, Gilday competed at the Sochi Olympics in the 1500m and 5000m relay. He finished 17th in the 1500m after a disqualification in the semi-finals and he finished in 6th as part of the 5000m relay. Michael retired from short track speed skating after the Olympics.

Michael Gilday was inducted into the NWT Sport Hall of Fame in 2017.

References

External links
Speed Skating Canada profile 

1987 births
Living people
Canadian male short track speed skaters
Olympic short track speed skaters of Canada
Short track speed skaters at the 2014 Winter Olympics
Sportspeople from Yellowknife
Sportspeople from Nunavut
People from Iqaluit